John Ioannou is an actor best known for his role as "Pete Riley" and "Alex Yankou" on the Degrassi series.

Filmography
The Gospel of John (2003)
The Fourth Angel (2001)
Degrassi Junior High (1987) 
The Kids of Degrassi Street (1982)
The Aphrodite Inheritance (1979)
The Greek Tycoon (1978)

External links

Living people
Year of birth missing (living people)
Canadian male television actors
Canadian people of Greek descent
Place of birth missing (living people)